Jung Jae-eun is a South Korean actress. She is known for her roles in dramas such as Who Are You: School 2015, I'm Sorry, But I Love You and Kill It.

Personal life
She married fellow actor Seo Hyun-chul in 2009 and they have one daughter.

Filmography

Television series

Film

Theatre

Awards and nominations

References

External links 
 
 

1969 births
Living people
21st-century South Korean actresses
South Korean female models
South Korean television actresses
South Korean film actresses